Revetal was the administrative centre of Re municipality, Norway, until the municipality was merged into Tønsberg. Together with the nearby housing estate Bergsåsen, it has a population (SSB 2005) of 1,902.

Revetal is a regional centre of trade and service, as well as some industry.

Tønsberg
Villages in Vestfold og Telemark